"Harmony Hall" is a song by American indie pop band Vampire Weekend. It is the lead single from their fourth studio album Father of the Bride, and was released on January 24, 2019 by Columbia Records as a double A-side with "2021". It was the band's highest-charting single on the U.S. Alternative Songs and Hot Rock Songs charts, peaking at No. 8 and No. 5, respectively. It also received a nomination for Best Rock Song at the 62nd Annual Grammy Awards.

Music and lyrics
The "rolling country-soul" and indie pop of "Harmony Hall" has been compared to the Grateful Dead, specifically their song "Touch of Grey". The song's release saw the band once again receive comparisons to the music of Paul Simon. The track's piano groove, percussion, and breakbeats are influenced by British baggy, rave, and Madchester music from the 1990s, such as  "Unbelievable" by EMF, while the piano and strings in the bridge exhibit a Baroque style.

The song's lyrics present a feeling of dread, contrasted against its upbeat sound. The song's chorus features the lyric "Anybody with a worried mind could never forgive the sight/Of wicked snakes inside a place you thought was dignified." The single's artwork features a snake. The chorus also features the lyric "I don’t wanna live like this, but I don't wanna die," an interpolation of the same lyric from Vampire Weekend's song "Finger Back" from their third album Modern Vampires of the City.

Title
The song shares the name of an undergraduate dormitory at Columbia University, where Vampire Weekend formed. Frontman Ezra Koenig has, however, said that the title is not a reference to the dormitory. The title has also been interpreted as a synonym for "echo chamber".

Critical reception
Jeremy D. Larson of Pitchfork described the song as "buoyant, filled with the kind of sunlit energy created when throwing open the shutters," but described its similarity to "Touch of Grey" as "a bit out of step". Will Richards of DIY praised the new upbeat sound, saying, "Of all the experimentation five and a half years could've brought for Vampire Weekend, 'Harmony Hall' simply sees them refining, expanding their palate subtly and gorgeously." Raisa Bruner of Time called the song "sweet and nimble" and said its "rich guitar and piano riffing" would please longtime fans.

Music video
A music video for the song was released on February 20, 2019. It features the band, as well as cameo appearances from Jonah Hill, Ariel Rechtshaid, Dev Hynes, and Danielle Haim. It was directed by Emmett Malloy, who previously directed videos for the band's singles "Giving Up the Gun" and "Holiday".

Personnel
Credits adapted from Qobuz and Tidal.

Musicians
 Ezra Koenig – vocals, acoustic guitar, piano
 Chris Baio – background vocals
 Danielle Haim – vocals
 Tommy King – piano
 Greg Leisz – electric guitar, steel guitar
 David Longstreth – electric guitar, vocals
 Benji Lysaght – guitar
 Justin Meldal-Johnsen – bass guitar
 Garrett Ray – drums
 Buddy Ross – keyboards, synthesizer
 Ariel Rechtshaid – bass guitar, percussion, programming, synthesizer, background vocals
 Chris Tomson – background vocals

Engineers
 Ariel Rechtshaid – recording
 Dave Schiffman – recording
 John DeBold – recording
 Chris Kasych – recording
 Manny Marroquin – mixing
 Chris Galland – engineering
 Chris Allgood – assistant engineering
 Robin Florent – assistant engineering
 Scott Desmarais – assistant engineering
 Emily Lazar – mastering

Charts

Weekly charts

Year-end charts

Certifications

References

2019 songs
2019 singles
Columbia Records singles
Song recordings produced by Ariel Rechtshaid
Song recordings produced by Rostam Batmanglij
Songs written by Ezra Koenig
Vampire Weekend songs